Baeyens is a surname. Notable people with the surname include:

Armand Baeyens (1928–2013), Belgian cyclist
August Baeyens (1895–1966), Belgian classical violinist and composer
Dominique Baeyens (born 1956), Belgian volleyball coach
Jan Baeyens (born 1957), Belgian racing cyclist

fr:Baeyens